George Robertson (14 April 186027 August 1933) was an English-born Australian bookseller and publisher, who alongside partner and Scotsman David Angus co-founded the publishing division of Angus & Robertson.

Biography
 
Robertson, the son of the Rev. John Robertson, was born at Halstead, Essex, England. He was educated at the Southwestern Academy, Glasgow and trained as a bookseller with James Maclehose, bookseller to the University of Glasgow.  He emigrated to New Zealand as a young man, and, two years later (in 1882), he relocated to Sydney, where he found employment at the local branch of George Robertson and Company, booksellers of Melbourne. He was not related to the founder of that firm. 

In January 1886 he joined David MacKenzie Angus in partnership, at first in Market Street, Sydney and later, in Castlereagh Street, Sydney. After Angus' death in 1900 Robertson continued in partnership with Frederick Wymark and Richard Thomson who had acquired Angus' share of the business, until in 1907 the partnership was converted into a public company and continues under the name of Angus & Robertson Ltd.

As a bookseller Robertson was always interested in buying "books and other rare items relating to Australia and adjacent regions". He encouraged the wealthy Sydney book collector David Scott Mitchell to collect early Australian books and manuscripts. Mitchell's formation of his unmatched collection, which he later bequeathed to the state of New South Wales, was "largely indebted to the efforts of booksellers who knew Australiana, including George Robertson, Fred W. Wymark, William Dymock and James R. Tyrrell".

Around 1895 the publishing side of the business began to be developed and many successful volumes were launched. Among the earlier authors were Henry Lawson, Banjo Paterson and Victor Daley. Robertson could recognize quickly a promising author and was willing to take considerable risks in backing his judgment. 

During the last 30 years of his life the number of volumes he published exceeded the total number brought out in the same period by all the other publishers in Australia. The Australian Encyclopaedia, published in two volumes in 1926, is one of the most important books published in Australia. 

In 1929 he founded the Halstead Press, which for 40 years would be "Australia's leading book printer". 

In recognition to Robertson's contribution to publishing, the Australian Publishers Association has established the George Robertson Award, for individuals who have 30+ years' service to publishing and its success.

He was married twice, first to Elizabeth Stewart Bruce in 1881, and, in 1910, to Eva Adeline Ducat. He died at the age of 73 and was survived by his second wife and his children (three daughters and a son) from his first marriage.

See also
 Angus & Robertson

References

Further reading

1860 births
1933 deaths
Australian booksellers
Antiquarian booksellers
Australian publishers (people)
People from Halstead
Businesspeople from Melbourne
People from Sydney
Australian people of Scottish descent
Scottish businesspeople
People associated with the University of Glasgow